Piano Concerto "The Fire" is the first piano concerto by the Chinese composer Tan Dun. It was commissioned by the New York Philharmonic under the direction of Lorin Maazel. Its premiere was given on 9 April 2008, by the Chinese pianist Lang Lang and the New York Philharmonic Orchestra conducted by Leonard Slatkin in Avery Fisher Hall, New York City. It has an approximate duration of 30 minutes. and is written in three movements:

 Lento
 Adagio melancholia
 Allegretto

The score is published by G. Schirmer. It is scored for two flutes, piccolo, two oboes, two clarinets, two bassoons, four horns, three trumpets, three trombone, one tuba, timpani, four percussion, harp, and strings.

It was described by Lang Lang as "very melodic, very rhythmic, and very dramatic." It requires that the pianist uses its fingers, palms, fists, and forearms to play the piece, therefore the pianist was described as a "martial artist of the keyboard".

It was well received by critics and described as a "mishmash of genres".

References

Compositions by Tan Dun
2008 compositions
Tan Dun
Chinese classical music
Music commissioned by the New York Philharmonic